The 1949 Lafayette Leopards football team was an American football team that represented Lafayette College in the Middle Three Conference during the 1949 college football season. In its first season under head coach Maurice J. "Clipper" Smith, the team compiled a 2–6 record. Gordon Schleer and Joseph Zahurak were the team captains. The team played its home games at Fisher Field in Easton, Pennsylvania.

Schedule

References

Lafayette
Lafayette Leopards football seasons
Lafayette Leopards football